Juan Miguel García Inglés (born 9 March 1971), known as Juanmi, is a Spanish retired professional footballer who played as a goalkeeper.

Over 12 seasons – 18 as a professional in total – he appeared in 267 La Liga matches, mainly in representation of Zaragoza (nine years).

Club career
Juanmi was born in Cartagena, Region of Murcia. He began his career with local Cartagena FC, playing two Segunda División games in 1987–88 – still a junior – in a relegation-ending campaign. In summer 1990 he signed with Real Madrid, going on to spend two full seasons for the reserves; in 1992–93, he was third-choice for the main squad behind Francisco Buyo and Pedro Jaro.

In the 1993 off-season, Juanmi moved to Real Zaragoza as backup to veteran Andoni Cedrún. After two years as second-choice (although he did manage a combined 27 La Liga appearances), he went on to become the Aragonese side's undisputed starter, being instrumental in their 2001 conquest of the Copa del Rey.

In July 2002, following Zaragoza's top-level relegation, Juanmi signed for Deportivo de La Coruña on a free transfer, initially backing up José Francisco Molina. However, a testicular cancer to the latter made him the starter, and he performed well enough to help the Galicians eventually finish third.

Subsequently, Juanmi joined Real Murcia, alternating between the posts and the bench in four years. After only six games in the 2006–07 season, in a final promotion, he moved to Gimnàstic de Tarragona also of the second division for one year. 

Juanmi retired in June 2008 at the age of 37, being immediately named hometown club's FC Cartagena's goalkeeping coach.

International career
Juanmi collected one cap for Spain, on 26 January 2000, in a match played in his city of birth. He replaced Molina for the final six minutes against Poland, in a 3–0 friendly win.

Honours
Zaragoza
Copa del Rey: 1993–94, 2000–01
UEFA Cup Winners' Cup: 1994–95

Deportivo
Supercopa de España: 2002

References

External links

1971 births
Living people
Sportspeople from Cartagena, Spain
Spanish footballers
Footballers from the Region of Murcia
Association football goalkeepers
La Liga players
Segunda División players
Segunda División B players
Cartagena FC players
Real Madrid Castilla footballers
Real Madrid CF players
Real Zaragoza players
Deportivo de La Coruña players
Real Murcia players
Gimnàstic de Tarragona footballers
Spain youth international footballers
Spain under-21 international footballers
Spain under-23 international footballers
Spain international footballers